Ioan Ploscaru (19 November 1911 – 31 July 1998) was a Romanian bishop of the Greek-Catholic Church. 

Born into a peasant family in Frata commune, Cluj County, he studied in Blaj. He was ordained a priest in 1933 and a bishop in November 1948. The latter ordainment was performed in secret by bishop Gerald O'Hara, shortly after the new Communist regime outlawed the church and arrested his predecessor, Ioan Bălan. Himself arrested in August 1949, Ploscaru spent a number of years in detention, including at the notorious Sighet Prison. 

After the collapse of the regime in 1989 and the church's legalization, he was the first Greek-Catholic bishop to officiate at a mass. This took place in January 1990, with the Romanian Orthodox Banat Metropolitan Nicolae Corneanu quickly agreeing to restore the Greek-Catholic churches in his province to their former owners. Ploscaru retired in 1996 and dies two years later in Lugoj.

Notes

1911 births
1998 deaths
People from Cluj County
Romanian Greek-Catholic bishops
Romanian anti-communist clergy
Romanian prisoners and detainees
People detained by the Securitate
Inmates of Sighet prison
Eastern Catholic bishops in Romania